Freer may refer to:

People
Ania Freer, Australian-Jamaican documentary filmmaker
Carl Freer (born 1970), Swedish businessman and technology entrepreneur
Charles Lang Freer (1854–1919), American industrialist and art collector
Dave Freer, Australian science fiction author
Fred Freer (1915–1998), Australian cricketer
Ian Freer (British Army officer) (born 1941), British Army general
Jacob S. Freer (1824–1892), New York politician
James Freer (1855–1933), Canadian film-maker
Mike Freer (born 1960), British politician
Randy Freer (born 1959/60), American television executive
Sir Robert Freer (1923–2012), Royal Air Force air chief marshal
Robert Elliott Freer (1896–1963), three-time Chairman of the United States Federal Trade Commission 
Romeo H. Freer (1846–1913), Attorney General of West Virginia
Warren Freer (1920–2013), New Zealand politician
Walter Freer (born 1846), Scottish politician and temperance activist

Places
 Freer, Texas
 Freer Gallery of Art, Washington, D.C.

See also
 Frear (disambiguation)